Dommartin-le-Franc is a commune in the Haute-Marne department in north-eastern France.

Geography
The Blaise flows northward through the middle of the commune and crosses the village.

People
It is the birthplace of Elzéar Auguste Cousin de Dommartin.

See also
Communes of the Haute-Marne department

References

Dommartinlefranc